Krameria lanceolata, commonly called  trailing krameria, is a flowering plant in the rhatany family (Krameriaceae). It is native to North America, where it is found in the southwestern and south-central United States, and the state states of Chihuahua and Coahuila in Mexico. It has populations disjunct eastward in the U.S. states of Florida and Georgia on the Coastal Plain. Its natural habitat is in sandy or rocky calcareous grasslands.

Krameria lanceolata is an herbaceous perennial that grows decumbent along the ground. It produces purple-red flowers in late spring through the summer.

References

Flora of Mexico
lanceolata